Vladimir Yakovlevich Dratchko (born 20 January 1970) is a Russian judoka.

Achievements

External links
 

1970 births
Living people
Russian male judoka
Goodwill Games medalists in judo
People from Tuapse
Competitors at the 1994 Goodwill Games
Sportspeople from Krasnodar Krai
20th-century Russian people
21st-century Russian people